Isuzu has used both its own engines and General Motors-built engines.  It has also produced engines for General Motors, Renault, Saab, Honda, Nissan, Opel, Toyota, and Mazda.

Overview
Isuzu engines carry a two-character prefix which designate the number of cylinders and engine family. Engines available currently include the following:

Two-cylinder

Diesel

Three-cylinder

Diesel

A Engines

L Engines

Four-cylinder

Petrol

GH engine
Isuzu's first petrol engines were license built Hillman units for the locally assembled Minx, from 1953. This was upgraded in 1956 for more power,  rather than the original's , and was renamed GH100.

GL engine
For 1959 Isuzu developed their own square design called the GL150, Isuzu's first own petrol engine. Still showing unmistakable Hillman origins it displaces  and has . The GL150 was fitted to the 1959 Isuzu Elf and the 1961 Bellel.

General Motors

 The Isuzu Hombre used a General Motors-built Vortec 2200 Engine with 118 hp (86 kW) and 140 ft·lb (190 N·m) of torque.
 2004–2006 Isuzu i-Series used a General Motors-built Vortec 2800 Engine with 175 hp (130 kW) and 185 ft·lb (251 N·m) of torque.
 2007–2008 Isuzu i-Series use a General Motors-built Vortec 2900 Engine with 185 hp (138 kW) and 195 ft·lb (263 N·m) of torque.

Isuzu G engine

Isuzu X engine

Isuzu Z engine

Diesel

Isuzu B engine
Isuzu considered the B engine their "small" truck engine. Initially designed in 1969 as a 3.6-liter four cylinder or a 5.4-liter six-cylinder direct injection unit, other displacements were added later on. In 1980 a 3.3-liter version appeared.

Isuzu C engine
Isuzu's C-series engine was a mainstay for their light truck production, as well as for industrial and marine uses. The engine was introduced in 1959; by 1985 over 2 million units had been produced. It was replaced in 1985 by the larger J-series engine.

Isuzu DL engine

Isuzu E engine
This family of engines started as the swirl chamber design, later modified into direct injection (4EE1), final improvement into a 16-valve direct common rail injection (4EE2).

Isuzu F engine

Isuzu H engine

All engines are SOHC with direct injection and are normally aspirated (N/A) or turbocharged (T) or turbocharged and intercooled (T/I)

4HL1 versons have common rail high-pressure fuel injection system with electronic control system (= CR-ECS)

Isuzu J engine

The J-series direct injection diesel engine was introduced in 1985, in 2.5 or 2.8 liter displacements. Initially installed only in lighter duty versions of the Isuzu Elf, it soon found its way into other Isuzu products. It replaced the somewhat smaller C engine; later on 3.1- and 3.0-liter versions were also introduced - still with four cylinders in line.

Isuzu RZ Engine
 The  is a 1.9L direct injection diesel powered, turbo intercooled engine which replaced the 4JK1-TCX found in Isuzu D-Max and Isuzu MU-X. The new engine's displacement is 1898cc, 601cc less than the 4JK1-TCX. In addition, the RZ4E-TC generates 150 hp at 3600rpm and 258 lb.-ft. of torque between 1800rpm to 2600rpm, giving it 16 hp and 22 lb.-ft. more than 4JK1-TCX. Isuzu has claimed that RZ4E-TC will have 19% better fuel efficiency compared to its predecessor. Bore is 80.0 mm and stroke is 94.4 mm.

CNG

CNG Engines
Isuzu developed the first Compressed Natural Gas (CNG) engine series with low-emissions truck mounted with a clean CNG engine emitting zero black smoke.

 The 4HF1-CNG is a CNG engine of 4.334 L capacity (as based on direct injection diesel engine) with non-contact ignition system. Bore is 115 mm, stroke is 108 mm.
 The 4HV1 is a CNG engine of 4.570 L capacity with non-contact ignition system. Bore is 115 mm, stroke is 110 mm. Application used for NPR300 CNG series.

Five-cylinder

Gasoline 

The Isuzu i-Series uses General Motors-built inline five-cylinder engines.

2004–2006 used the General Motors-built Vortec 3500 Engine with 220 hp (164 kW) and 225 ft·lb (305 N·m) of torque.
2007–2008 used the General Motors-built Vortec 3700 Engine with 242 hp (180 kW) and 242 ft·lb (327 N·m) of torque.

Six-cylinder

Gasoline

General Motors

2002–2009 SUV use the General Motors-built Atlas 4200 Engine with 275 hp (205 kW) and 275 ft·lbf (373 N·m) of torque. For the 2007 model year, the GMT360 platform received an increase to 291 hp (217 kW) and 277 ft·lb (376 N·m) of torque.
The 1996–2000 Isuzu Hombre used the General Motors-built Vortec 4300 Engine with 180 hp (134 kW) and 245 ft·lb (332 N·m) of torque.

Isuzu V engine

The Isuzu V engine is a family of all-aluminum 75° V6 gasoline engines ranging from 3.2 to 3.5 liters.

Diesel

Eight-cylinder

Gasoline
2001–2009 Isuzu SUV's use the General Motors-built Vortec 5300 Engine with 285 hp (213 kW) and 325 ft·lb (441 N·m) of torque.
Isuzu Commercial trucks use the General Motors-built Vortec 6000 Engine with 300 hp (224 kW) and 360 ft·lb (488 N·m) of torque.

Diesel
The 8PA1 is a  V8 diesel truck engine.
Isuzu co-designed and built some of the Duramax V8 engine along with General Motors from 2001-2010.

Twelve-cylinder

Gasoline

Diesel

References

External links
 Official Website -Isuzu Commercial Vehicles

 
Isuzu